The 1949 Jordan League was the 5th season of Jordan League, and the first under the patronage of the Jordan Football Association who was founded in 1949. Al-Ahli won its second title .

Overview
Al-Ahli won the championship.

References

RSSSF

External links
 Jordan Football Association website

Jordanian Pro League seasons
Jordan
Jordan
football